Archie Pate (July 15, 1886 - April 16, 1936) was an American baseball outfielder and pitcher in the Negro leagues.

In 1909, at the age of 22, he was pitching for the St. Paul Colored Gophers. He was playing with many notable players, including Dick Wallace, Chappie Johnson, Will McMurray, William Binga, and Bobby Marshall.

He would move across town in 1910 to play two seasons for the Minneapolis Keystones where he would also play with future Kansas City Monarchs pitcher Hurley McNair.

He moved on to play in Chicago for the Leland Giants and Chicago Giants.

Pate died in Chicago, Illinois at the age of 49, and is buried at Restvale Cemetery in Alsip, Illinois

References

External links

Leland Giants players
Minneapolis Keystones players
St. Paul Colored Gophers players
Baseball players from Mississippi
1886 births
1936 deaths
Sportspeople from Starkville, Mississippi
20th-century African-American people
Burials at Restvale Cemetery